Papilio alexiares, the Mexican tiger swallowtail, is a species of swallowtail butterfly from the genus Papilio that is found in Mexico and southern Texas.

Subspecies
Papilio alexiares alexiares  (east-central Mexico)
Papilio alexiares garcia Rothschild & Jordan, 1906 north-eastern Mexico, western Texas

Taxonomy
It is sometimes listed as a subspecies of Papilio glaucus.

References

alexiares
Butterflies described in 1866
Butterflies of North America
Taxa named by Carl Heinrich Hopffer